Filip Windlert (born January 24, 1993) is a Swedish professional ice hockey defenceman. He made his Elitserien debut playing with AIK during the 2011–12 Elitserien season.

References

External links

1993 births
AIK IF players
Living people
Malmö Redhawks players
Swedish ice hockey defencemen
HC TPS players